Woodstock was a 1969 music festival in Bethel, New York, U.S.

Woodstock may also refer to:

Places

Australia
Woodstock, New South Wales
Woodstock, Queensland
Woodstock, Tasmania, a locality
Woodstock, Victoria

Canada
Woodstock, New Brunswick, a town in Carleton County
Woodstock Parish, New Brunswick, civil parish surrounding the town
Woodstock (electoral district), a provincial electoral district for the Legislative Assembly of New Brunswick, Canada
Woodstock, Newfoundland and Labrador
Woodstock, Nova Scotia
Woodstock, Ontario
 Woodstock railway station (Ontario)

Ireland
Woodstock Estate, a wooded estate by the river Nore

New Zealand
Woodstock, Tasman, near Motueka, in the northwestern South Island
Woodstock, Waikato, now called Fairfield, a suburb of Hamilton
Woodstock, West Coast, near Kaniere, in the western South Island

South Africa
Woodstock, Cape Town
Woodstock railway station (Cape Town), a Metrorail railway station in Woodstock, Cape Town

United Kingdom
Woodstock, Oxfordshire, a small town in Oxfordshire, England
Woodstock (UK Parliament constituency), a defunct Parliamentary constituency
Woodstock Palace, a former royal residence
Woodstock, Belfast, an electoral ward of East Belfast
Woodstock, Kent, a location in the UK
Woodstock, Pembrokeshire, Wales

United States

Woodstock, Alabama
Woodstock, Alameda, California
Woodstock, Connecticut
Woodstock, Georgia
 Woodstock Country Club, Indiana
Woodstock, Illinois
Woodstock (Metra), a commuter-rail station in the town of Woodstock, Illinois
Woodstock Township, Schuyler County, Illinois
 Woodstock, Kentucky, a former community near Louisville, Kentucky, now annexed to Graymoor-Devondale
Woodstock, Maine
Woodstock, Maryland
Woodstock Township, Michigan
Woodstock, Minnesota
Woodstock, New Hampshire
Woodstock, New York
Woodstock (CDP), New York, the primary hamlet within the town of Woodstock
Woodstock, Ohio
Woodstock, Portland, Oregon
Woodstock Park (Portland, Oregon)
Woodstock, Vermont
Woodstock (village), Vermont, in the town of Woodstock
Woodstock, Virginia
Battle of Woodstock, an American Civil War battle near Woodstock, Virginia
Woodstock, Northampton County, Virginia
Woodstock, Wisconsin

Buildings of note
Woodstock, Burwood, a heritage-listed building in the Sydney suburb of Burwood, New South Wales
Woodstock (Lexington, Kentucky), listed on the NRHP in Fayette County, Kentucky
Woodstock (Natchez, Mississippi), a Greek Revival building built in 1851
Woodstock (Scotland Neck, North Carolina), listed on the NRHP in Halifax County, North Carolina
Woodstock (Trenton, Kentucky), listed on the NRHP in Todd County, Kentucky
Woodstock (Upper Marlboro, Maryland), a historic home in Upper Marlboro, Prince George's County, Maryland, United States
Woodstock (Wilmington, Delaware), listed on the NRHP in Wilmington, Delaware

People
Edmund of Woodstock, 1st Earl of Kent (1301–1330), son of Edward I of England
Mary of Woodstock (1279–1332), daughter of Edward I of England
Thomas of Woodstock, 1st Duke of Gloucester (1355–1397), son of Edward III of England
William Bentinck, Viscount Woodstock (born 1984), writer and social entrepreneur

Arts, entertainment, and media

Literature
Woodstock (novel), an 1826 novel by Walter Scott
Thomas of Woodstock (play), a play which has been spuriously attributed to Shakespeare

Music

Festivals
Woodstock Festival, original festival 1969
Woodstock Sound-Outs, mini-festivals held outside Woodstock, NY from 1967 to 1970
Woodstock '79, 10th anniversary rock concert that took place at Madison Square Garden
Woodstock '89, "The Forgotten Woodstock", 20th anniversary rock concert that took place in August 1989 on the site of the original Woodstock concert
Woodstock '94, 25th anniversary music festival
Woodstock '99, 30th anniversary music festival
Woodstock 50, cancelled 50th anniversary music festival
The Harlem Cultural Festival, also known as the "Black Woodstock", a series of music concerts in New York City held in 1969
Przystanek Woodstock, an annual Polish music festival, named after the 1969 event
Woodstock en Beauce, a summer festival in Southern Quebec, Canada
Woodstockert, an event held at Stockert Radio Telescope, Germany

Albums
Woodstock: Music from the Original Soundtrack and More, a live album from the 1969 festival
Woodstock Two, the second live album from the 1969 festival 
Woodstock: Three Days of Peace and Music, a box set of performances from the 1969 festival
Woodstock 40 Years On: Back To Yasgur's Farm, a box set of performances from the 1969 festival
Woodstock (Jimi Hendrix album), 1994
Woodstock (Portugal. The Man album), 2017
Woodstock 1999 (album), a live album from the 1999 festival
Woodstock – Back to the Garden: The Definitive 50th Anniversary Archive, a 38-disc box set of the music of the 1969 festival

Songs
"Woodstock" (song) by Joni Mitchell, covered by Crosby, Stills, Nash & Young and other artists
"Woodstock", a song by Big and Rich from the deluxe digital version of Between Raising Hell and Amazing Grace
”Woodstock (Psychedelic Fiction)”, a song by American rapper/singer-songwriter Jon Bellion

Other arts, entertainment, and media
Woodstock (film), a 1970 documentary about the 1969 festival
Woodstock (Peanuts), a character in the comic strip Peanuts
Woodstock Express (disambiguation), a number of roller coasters operated by Cedar Fair and named for the character
Woodstock Times, a newspaper in the New York town of Woodstock
Woodstock Film Festival, an American film festival that was launched in 2000

Education
 Woodstock Academy, a school in Woodstock, Connecticut, U.S.
 Woodstock College, a former Jesuit seminary in Maryland, U.S.
 Woodstock Theological Center, a Catholic theological research institute in Washington D.C.
 Woodstock Elementary School (disambiguation)
 Woodstock High School (disambiguation)
 Woodstock School (disambiguation)

Other uses
Woodstock, a typewriter invented by Alvah C. Roebuck
Maupin Woodstock One, glider
Woodstock Pub, a pub in Bangkok, Thailand

See also 
Woodstock Airport (disambiguation)
Woodstock Road (disambiguation)